Impatiens pseudoviola, commonly known as the jewelweed and touch me not, is a species of flowering plant in the family Balsaminaceae, native to Kenya and Tanzania.

Description 
This plant grows between 6-12cm. It flowers bright pink between summer and autumn.

This perennial species has ovate, alternate toothed leaves.

Cultivation 
It has gained the Royal Horticultural Society's Award of Garden Merit.

This species prefers to be grown in a semi-shade environment. It can be propagated with stem cuttings during the spring or summer months. However, it is not hardy and it is recommended that it is kept indoors during the winter months.

Pests and diseases 
This plant is susceptible to  red spider mites, aphids, downy mildew, and whiteflies.

References

pseudoviola
Plants described in 1909